Vrachionas, also known as Vrakhiónas is the highest peak on the island Zakynthos which is one of the Ionian Islands of Greece in the Mediterranean Sea.

References

 
Mountains_of_the_Ionian_Islands_(region)